The Argenton is a  river in the Nouvelle-Aquitaine region in western France. It is a left tributary of the Thouet.

Its source is in the commune of Cirières. Its course crosses the department of Deux-Sèvres. It flows generally northeast through the towns of Le Pin, Nueil-les-Aubiers, Argenton-les-Vallées and Argenton-l'Église, finally flowing into the Thouet near Saint-Martin-de-Sanzay.

References

Rivers of France
Rivers of Nouvelle-Aquitaine
Rivers of Deux-Sèvres